Henri Cowap (1861 – 21 October 1930) was a plumber and member of the Queensland Legislative Assembly in Australia.

Biography
Cowap was born in Chester, England, to parents William Cowap and his wife Emma (née Latham) and attended school while still in  Chester. He arrived in Queensland in 1882 where he became an apprentice plumber and by 1888 was working in Mt Morgan, He later worked as a shops and factories inspector.

On his retirement from public life he devoted himself to friendly societies and was a member of the Manchester Unity Independent Order of Oddfellows. He was also a member of the member and secretary of 763 Masonic Lodge, Scotch Constitution.

On 29 May 1886 he married Mary Jane West (died 1947) and together had two daughters. He died in Brisbane in October 1930 and his funeral proceeded from his Wooloowin residence to the Lutwyche Cemetery.

Political career
Muller represented the state seat of Fitzroy from 1902 until 1909. He started out representing the Labour Party but by the end of his political career he was a member of the Kidstonites.

References

Members of the Queensland Legislative Assembly
1861 births
1930 deaths
Burials at Lutwyche Cemetery
English emigrants to colonial Australia